The Arlington Classic Stakes is a Grade III American Thoroughbred horse race for three year old horses over a distance of  miles on the turf held annually in late May at Arlington Park race track near Chicago.

History 

The event was inaugurated in 1929 as the Classic Stakes over a distance of  miles on the dirt.

At one time the Arlington Classic was one of the most important races in the United States, drawing the best 3-year-olds in the country. Triple Crown winner Gallant Fox attracted a crowd of 60,000 in 1930 and he continued his six race winning streak in the event. In 1932 when Gusto, a grandson of the great Man o' War won, it was then the richest race for 3-year-olds in America with a purse of $88,100.
A noteworthy upset in the Arlington Classic occurred in 1946 when Assault, who had just won the United States Triple Crown, finished last.

The Arlington Classic was run at the now defunct Washington Park Racetrack from 1943 through 1945. It was known as the Grand Prix Stakes in 1971, 1972 and 1973 and in 1977 it was made open to horses three-year-olds and up as was labelled as the Arlington Classic Invitational Handicap. There was no race held in 1974, 1975, 1976, 1988, 1998 and 1999.

The Arlington Classic became part of Arlington Park's "Mid-America Triple" which included the American Derby in July and the Secretariat Stakes in August. The Triple was last won by Honor Glide in 1997.

The event held a Grade I classification between 1981 and 1989.

In 2007, this Grade III stakes race was downgraded to an ungraded stakes by the American Graded Stakes Committee, but it has been returned to its Grade III status.

The Arlington Classic was raced on dirt from 1929–1973, 1977–1987, 1989–1993.

Distance
Since its inception, the Arlington Classic has been contested over a variety of distances:
 1929–1951 –  miles (dirt)
 1952–1972 – 1 mile (dirt)
 1973 –  miles (dirt)
 1977–1979 –  miles (dirt)
 1980–1993 –  miles (dirt)
 1994–2001 –  miles (turf)
 2001 onwards –   miles (turf)

Records
Speed record: (at current  miles distance)
1:41.87 – Silver Max (2012)

Largest margin of victory:
 13 lengths – Alydar (1978)

Most wins by an owner:
 4 – Belair Stud
 3 – Calumet Farm

Most wins by a jockey:
 6 – Pat Day
 4 – Braulio Baeza, René Douglas

Most wins by a trainer:
 4 – Sunny Jim Fitzsimmons
 3 – Ben A. Jones, William I. Mott, Max Hirsch

Winners of the Arlington Classic

Legend:

 
 
 
 

Notes:

¶ Filly

† Held at Washington Park Race Track

References

Flat horse races for three-year-olds
Turf races in the United States
Graded stakes races in the United States
1929 establishments in Illinois
Recurring sporting events established in 1929
Arlington Park
Horse races in Illinois